Iconium is an unincorporated community in St. Clair County, Missouri, United States. The town is perhaps best known for "Scott's Iconium Store," a local institution that is a frequent pilgrimage destination for Boy Scouts, due to the community's proximity to the H. Roe Bartle Scout Reservation.

Iconium was founded in 1879, and named after the ancient region of Iconium.  A post office called Iconium was established in 1871, and remained in operation until 1959.

References

External links 
 Scott's Iconium Store

Unincorporated communities in St. Clair County, Missouri
Unincorporated communities in Missouri